Hendrik Keun (1738 – 1787), was an 18th-century painter from the Northern Netherlands.

Biography
He was born in Haarlem. According to the RKD his cityscapes were inspired by Jan van der Heyden.	
according to another biographer he was inspired by the Berckheyde brothers. His view of the Zijlstraat in Haarlem was engraved for the city of Haarlem.
He died in Haarlem.

References

External links

Hendrik Keun on Artnet	

1738 births
1787 deaths
18th-century Dutch painters
18th-century Dutch male artists
Dutch male painters
Artists from Haarlem